David Morway is currently the Assistant General Manager of the Utah Jazz. Morway was the former General Manager of the Indiana Pacers of the National Basketball Association, as well as a former Assistant General Manager of the Milwaukee Bucks. He had also been an assistant general manager with the San Diego Padres from 1985 to 1988.  He is a 1982 graduate of the University of Arizona with a law degree from the University of San Diego.  

Morway was a finalist for the Portland Trail Blazers general manager position in 2012.

Morway is married with two teenage sons.

References

External links
Pacers promote David Morway to General Manager

Living people
Indiana Pacers executives
National Basketball Association general managers
University of Arizona alumni
Year of birth missing (living people)